One Sansome Street, also known as Citigroup Center, is an office skyscraper located at the intersection of Sutter and Sansome Streets in the Financial District of San Francisco, California, United States, near Market Street. The , 41 floor,   office tower was completed in 1984.

History

The One Sansome Street tower is built adjacent to the site of the ornate Anglo and London Paris National Bank, which was completed in 1910. The historic architecture of the bank building serves as a conservatory for the skyscraper today.

One Sansome Street was acquired by Beacon Capital Partners LLC from BayernLB in 2005 for $217 million or $394.55 per ft² ($4,247.32 per m²).  BayernLB bought the building in 1999 from subsidiaries of Citigroup and Dai-ichi Life for between $170–175 million, or $310–320 per ft² ($3,337-3,445 per m²). By 2010, it was owned by Broadway Partners Fund Manager, LLC. In 2010, a partnership between Barker Pacific Group and Prudential Real Estate Investors took ownership of the building. In 2011, Citigroup signed a lease extension through 2022 to remain the building's anchor tenant.

The building contains direct underground access to the Montgomery Street Station.

Tenants
 Wish
 Citigroup
 Lime
 Consulate-General of Luxembourg, Suite 830
 Consulate-General of the United Kingdom, Suite 850
 Factset
 Houlihan Lokey
 Travelzoo
 Paycom
Premier Business Centers 
 Morgan Stanley
 HUD
 Michael Page
Capsilon

In Media
 Represents the Pacific Stock Exchange entrance when Jack Casey (Kevin Bacon) meets Hector Rodriguez (Paul Rodriguez) on Sansome Street, just before Jack's "lightning strike" in Quicksilver (film).

See also

 San Francisco's tallest buildings

References

External links
 One Sansome Street office website
 Anglo & London Paris National Bank in the Historic American Buildings Survey, 1981

Skyscraper office buildings in San Francisco
Citigroup buildings
Bank buildings in California
Office buildings completed in 1984
Financial District, San Francisco
Dai-ichi Life
William Pereira buildings
Leadership in Energy and Environmental Design platinum certified buildings